This article contains a list of the schools, colleges, and universities in the Roman Catholic Archdiocese of Baltimore.

Colleges and universities

Secondary schools

Primary schools 
 Archbishop Borders Elementary School, Baltimore
 Cardinal Shehan School, Baltimore
 Holy Angels Catholic School, Baltimore
 Immaculate Conception School, Towson
 Immaculate Heart of Mary School, Towson
 John Paul Regional Catholic School, Baltimore
 Monsignor Slade Catholic School, Glen Burnie
 Mother Seton Academy, Baltimore
 Mother Seton School, Emmitsburg
 Our Lady of Grace School, Parkton
 Our Lady of Hope–St. Luke School, Baltimore
 Our Lady of Perpetual Help School, Ellicott City
 Our Lady of Victory School, Arbutus
 Resurrection–St. Paul School, Ellicott City
 School of the Cathedral of Mary Our Queen, Baltimore
 School of the Incarnation, Gambrills
 Sisters Academy of Baltimore, Baltimore
 SS. James & John School, Baltimore
 St. Augustine School, Elkridge
 St. Casimir Catholic School, Baltimore
 St. Clement Mary Hofbauer School, Baltimore
 St. Elizabeth School, Baltimore
 St. Francis of Assisi School, Baltimore
 St. Ignatius Loyola Academy, Baltimore
 St. Jane Frances School, Pasadena
 St. Joan of Arc School, Aberdeen
 St. John Regional Catholic School, Frederick
 St. John School, Westminster
 St. John the Evangelist School, Hydes
 St. John the Evangelist School, Severna Park
 St. Joseph School, Cockeysville
 St. Joseph School, Fullerton
 St. Louis School, Clarksville
 St. Margaret School, Bel Air
 St. Mark School, Catonsville
 St. Mary School, Hagerstown
 St. Mary's School, Annapolis
 St. Michael the Archangel School, Baltimore
 St. Philip Neri School, Linthicum
 St. Pius X School, Rodgers Forge
 St. Stephen School, Bradshaw
 St. Thomas Aquinas School, Baltimore
 St. Thomas More Academy, Middletown
 St. Ursula School, Baltimore
 Trinity School, Ellicott City

Former schools

Former colleges and universities

Former secondary schools

Former primary schools

References 

Baltimore
Baltimore

Baltimore, Roman Catholic Archdiocese
Baltimore-related lists